Yashan Samarasinghe (born 14 September 1994) is a Sri Lankan cricketer. He made his first-class debut for Badureliya Sports Club in the 2015–16 Premier League Tournament on 15 January 2016.

References

External links
 

1994 births
Living people
Sri Lankan cricketers
Badureliya Sports Club cricketers
Cricketers from Colombo